Helen Marion Palmer Geisel (September 16, 1898 – October 23, 1967), known professionally as Helen Palmer, was an American children's writer, editor, and philanthropist. She was also the Founder and Vice President of Beginner Books, and was married to fellow writer Theodor Seuss Geisel, better known as Dr. Seuss, from 1927 until her death. 

Her best-known books include Do You Know What I'm Going to Do Next Saturday?, I Was Kissed by a Seal at the Zoo, Why I Built the Boogle House, and A Fish Out Of Water.

Life

Early life and college
Helen Palmer was born in New York City in 1898 and spent her childhood in Bedford–Stuyvesant, a prosperous Brooklyn neighborhood. As a child, she contracted polio, but recovered from it almost completely. Her father, George Howard Palmer, an ophthalmologist, died when she was 11. 

She graduated from Wellesley College with honors in 1920. She then spent three years teaching English at Girls High School in Brooklyn before moving with her mother to England to attend Oxford University.

She met her future husband, Ted Geisel, in class at Oxford. She had a profound influence on his life, starting with her suggestion that he should be an artist rather than an English professor. She later stated, "Ted's notebooks were always filled with these fabulous animals. So I set to work diverting him; here was a man who could draw such pictures; he should be earning a living doing that." They married in 1927. She could not have children because of medical conditions.

Post-war success
Following World War II, she worked in Hollywood with her husband. The two shared the writing credit on  Design for Death, which won the 1947 Academy Award for Best Documentary Feature.

For the next decade, she was the primary source of encouragement for and was an editor of her husband's prolific books for children. That support continued a few years more even as her health became an issue.

Illness and suicide
Palmer committed suicide in 1967 with an overdose of barbiturates after a series of illnesses spanning 13 years. She wrote in her suicide note:

Dear Ted, What has happened to us? I don't know. I feel myself in a spiral, going down down down, into a black hole from which there is no escape, no brightness. And loud in my ears from every side I hear, 'failure, failure, failure...' I love you so much ... I am too old and enmeshed in everything you do and are, that I cannot conceive of life without you ... My going will leave quite a rumor but you can say I was overworked and overwrought. Your reputation with your friends and fans will not be harmed ... Sometimes think of the fun we had all thru the years ... 

Eight months later, in June 1968, Seuss married the woman with whom he reportedly had been having an affair.

Nonetheless, Seuss later described how he felt at her death: "I didn't know whether to kill myself, burn the house down, or just go away and get lost." His niece Peggy commented: "Whatever Helen did, she did it out of absolute love for Ted." Secretary Julie Olfe called Palmer's death "her last and greatest gift to him."

Works
Helen Palmer's best-known book is Do You Know What I'm Going To Do Next Saturday?, published in 1963. This book combined Palmer's stories with photographs by Lynn Fayman, as did two other books: I Was Kissed by a Seal at the Zoo (1962) and Why I Built the Boogle House (1964). The photographs in I Was Kissed by a Seal at the Zoo were taken at the San Diego Zoo in Balboa Park, San Diego, California, and featured children from the Francis Parker School in San Diego interacting with the zoo's animals and staff. 

She also expanded the Dr. Seuss short story "Gustav the Goldfish" into the book A Fish Out Of Water (1961), which was illustrated by P. D. Eastman.

See also

References

Citations

Sources

External links

 

1898 births
1967 suicides
American children's writers
20th-century American writers
20th-century American women writers
Dr. Seuss
Drug-related suicides in California
Barbiturates-related deaths
Writers from Amherst, Massachusetts
Writers from Brooklyn
American women children's writers
People from Bedford–Stuyvesant, Brooklyn
American expatriates in the United Kingdom